Tipton St John is a village in the civil parish of Ottery St Mary in the English county of Devon. It has a population of around 350. The village is built on rising ground overlooking the River Otter.

Railway
Between the village and the river lies the site of the former Tipton St Johns railway station, closed in 1967. The station was the junction between the Sidmouth Railway and the Budleigh Salterton Railway from 1897.

Facilities
The village has a pub called The Golden Lion Pub and had a post office until 2008, when it was closed. The village primary school has 97 students and 16 staff and is administered by Devon County Council. The village also has a Scout group 1st Tipton St John Scouts, which has included Beavers, Cubs, Scouts and Explorers.

References

External links

 Otter Valley Weather

Villages in Devon
Ottery St Mary